Daniel Dennis (born September 24, 1986) is an American freestyle wrestler who competed for the United States at 57 KG in the 2016 Olympics.  He stands 5 foot, 5 inches.

High school career
He was a two-time Illinois state runner-up  for Grant Community High School in Fox Lake, Illinois.

College career
Dennis was a two-time All-American for the Iowa Hawkeyes, including a runner-up finish in 2010. In the 2010 finals match, Dennis gave up four points with under five seconds left to the University of Minnesota's Jayson Ness to lose the match.  Following this stunning defeat, Dennis checked out for a few years, living out of his truck and later a trailer, travelling around the Western United States while wrestling and coaching sporadically.  He eventually became a coach at Windsor High School in California.

Post-college career
Dennis has made two national teams (Top 3 at the World Team Trials), at 61 kg in 2015 and 57 kg in 2016. Dennis won the 2016 US Olympic Team Trials at 57 KG and competed at the 2016 Olympics, but lost his first match 11-0 to Vladimir Dubov and was eliminated after Dubov failed to reach the finals. Dennis has also won the University Nationals championship, the Grand Prix of Spain, and is a two-time Northern Plains regional champion.

References

External links
 

American male sport wrestlers
Living people
1986 births
Olympic wrestlers of the United States
Wrestlers at the 2016 Summer Olympics